Keratin, type I cuticular Ha3-I is a protein that in humans is encoded by the KRT33A gene.

The protein encoded by this gene is a member of the keratin gene family. It is one of the type I hair keratin genes which are clustered in a region of chromosome 17q12-q21 and have the same direction of transcription. As a type I hair keratin, it is an acidic protein which heterodimerizes with type II keratins to form hair and nails. There are two isoforms of this protein, encoded by two separate genes, KRTHA3A and KRTHA3B.

References

Further reading